Zoltán Pálkovács (August 6, 1981 – September 25, 2010) was a Slovak judoka of Hungarian ethnicity. He was born in Rimavská Sobota and died in a traffic accident in Vienna.

Achievements

References

External links
 

1981 births
2010 deaths
Slovak male judoka
Judoka at the 2004 Summer Olympics
Judoka at the 2008 Summer Olympics
Olympic judoka of Slovakia
Hungarians in Slovakia
Sportspeople from Rimavská Sobota
Road incident deaths in Austria